Rouda is a surname. Notable people with the surname include:

Harley Rouda (born 1961), American politician
Kaira Rouda (born 1963), American author